In probability theory and statistics, a mixture is a probabilistic combination of two or more probability distributions. The concept arises mostly in two contexts:
 A mixture defining a new probability distribution from some existing ones, as in a mixture distribution or a compound distribution. Here a major problem often is to derive the properties of the resulting distribution.
 A mixture used as a statistical model such as is often used for statistical classification. The model may represent the population from which observations arise as a mixture of several components, and the problem is that of a mixture model, in which the task is to infer from which of a discrete set of sub-populations each observation originated.

See also
 Mixture distribution
 Compound distribution
 Mixture model
 classification
 Cluster analysis

References

Probability theory
Compound probability distributions
Statistical classification